Everyman (Hannibal Bates) is a supervillain published by DC Comics. He debuted in 52 #17 (August 2006), and was created by Grant Morrison, Geoff Johns, Greg Rucka, Mark Waid, Keith Giffen and Joe Bennett. His name is a combination of Hannibal Lecter and Norman Bates.

Everyman made his live-action debut on The Flash season one, portrayed by Martin Novotny.

Fictional character biography
Everyman is a shapeshifter, who can physically transform into another person after eating part of their body. He was generally unpopular with his teammates, mostly due to his searching for components of his teammates' living matter (e.g. hair and toenail clippings) to eat. It was later revealed that he had killed his teammate Skyman and had been masquerading as him for quite some time. During the impersonation, he 'assisted' Natasha Irons in her investigation of Lex Luthor's superhuman program. Skyman's ravaged body was shown; Hannibal stated that though he only needs a small portion, he just likes the taste. Natasha, who was romantically involved with Skyman, battled and nearly subdued Everyman, until Lex Luthor saved him.

When Steel (John Henry Irons) and the Teen Titans came to rescue Natasha Irons, Everyman lured Steel by posing as Natasha, then morphed into a giant crab and tried to crush him, but the heroes easily defeated him. Fleeing the battle, Everyman was next seen masquerading as Lex Luthor as the former mogul was led to jail. His ruse was discovered by Clark Kent and the real Luthor was placed into custody.

One Year Later, Everyman posed as Ted Kord, returned from the grave, until a DNA test proved otherwise, and he was taken into custody. He was later freed by Circe, who ordered him to disguise himself as Sarge Steel, and investigate the events leading up to the "Amazons Attack" storyline.

In the aftermath, Everyman was captured and arrested by Nemesis. Everyman reappeared, this time impersonating Green Arrow and tried to murder Black Canary on their wedding night. She managed to kill him with an arrow to the neck. His deception was not discovered until a month later when Batman and Doctor Mid-Nite performed an autopsy. It was later revealed by Granny Goodness (in the guise of Athena) that the switch was made during the Injustice League's attack on the wedding. Everyman was meant to pose as Green Arrow for a short time, then fake his death. Everyman had impotency, which compelled him to try and kill Black Canary on the wedding night, rather than chance his cover being blown.

It was later revealed that Everyman had survived Black Canary's attack. The villain woke up, naked in an alley, with amnesia, believing himself to be Oliver Queen. He returned to "his" home, only to be confronted by the real Green Arrow. Although unsure of who was who at first, Black Canary was able to identify the fake by the stab wound on his neck, and rallied with her husband against him. Everyman managed to get away, only to be captured by the new Big Game, who intended to use him in one of his plots.

Everyman is later seen teamed up with Cupid, a vigilante obsessed with Green Arrow, and calling himself Dark Arrow. The two lure Green Arrow, Black Canary and Speedy into a trap, setting off explosive charges that seem to kill them. Watching from a distance, Cobalt, one of Big Game's subordinates, activates nanites in Dark Arrow's bloodstream, compelling him to strangle Cupid. However, the act brings him to remember the night he tried to kill Black Canary, freeing him from the nanites' control. Cupid then injects him with a "love potion", putting him under her thrall again. The group are then attacked by Green Arrow and company, who had escaped the blast. During the fight, Cupid sets off one of Speedy's quantum arrows, creating an explosion that covers the villainous couple's escape. Cupid later kills Everyman, declaring their relationship "a rebound thing".

Everyman was identified as one of the deceased villains entombed below the Hall of Justice. His body was later revived as part of the Black Lantern Corps.

Powers and abilities
Thanks to Luthor's Exo-gene program, Everyman is able to duplicate any organic lifeform, provided he eats a small portion of it first. He loses those powers when his Exo-gene is shut down by Lex Luthor, but they are restored by Circe. His duplication is far more than skin deep. All physical evidence reads as identical to whomever he is impersonating. Even Hal Jordan's Green Lantern power ring has been fooled. However, it appears Everyman cannot accurately duplicate non-organic matter, as evidenced when he replicated Sarge Steel, who possesses a metal hand. Nemesis was able to tell who the real Steel was by stabbing the impostor's "metal" hand with a pencil, drawing blood.

In other media
 Hannibal Bates appears in The Flash, portrayed by Martin Novotny in his featureless "natural state" and several others while disguised. Following S.T.A.R. Labs' particle accelerator exploding in the pilot episode, this version gained the ability to shapeshift into anyone he touches, though he cannot mimic powers and is left unable to remember his original appearance. Introduced in the season one episode "Who is Harrison Wells?", Bates uses his ability to frame a number of people for crimes they did not commit before he is later confronted and defeated by the Flash. In the following episode "The Trap", Eobard Thawne has Bates impersonate him to confront Team Flash, but the shapeshifter is killed by Joe West. As of season six, due to changes made to the multiverse following the events of "Crisis on Infinite Earths", Bates was revived off-screen.
 Everyman appears in Young Justice, voiced by Nolan North. This version is a member of the Light's Infinity, Inc., which is later reworked into the Infinitors.

References

Characters created by Mark Waid
Characters created by Grant Morrison
Characters created by Geoff Johns
Characters created by Keith Giffen
Characters created by Greg Rucka
Comics characters introduced in 2006
DC Comics characters who are shapeshifters
DC Comics male supervillains
DC Comics metahumans
Fictional cannibals
Fictional characters with amnesia
Fictional impostors